Fußballtrainer Wulff is a German television series.

List of episodes
 Irrtum, Herr Professor
 Brot oder Spiele
 Reserve hat Wut
 Aus bester Familie
 Hinter dem Totengrund
 45 Pferde
 Zum Fischen nach Split
 Komm, komm Casanova
 Das Kuckucksei
 Totes Kapital
 Shortys schnelle Pulle
 Wach auf, Kapitän!
 Der Sündenbock
 Ruheloser Ruhestand
 Zwiebeln aus Holland
 Ein Schloß in Bayern
 Mit Zitronen gehandelt
 1:0 für Eva
 Eisenmax muß weichen
 Was kannst du?
 Erbschaft mit zwei Beinen
 Bestechung
 Auf nach Avignon
 Verhexte Mittsommernacht
 Schwedische Gardinen
 Die Axt im Walde

External links
 
 (German)

1972 German television series debuts
1973 German television series endings
German-language television shows
German sports television series
Das Erste original programming